Below is a list of events in Baltimore, Maryland, United States, which holds numerous annual events, by month.

January
 Martin Luther King Jr. Day Parade

February
 ClipperCon

March
 Saint Patrick's Day Parade

April
 Privateer Festival

May
 Baltimore Flower Mart
 Maryland Film Festival
 Balticon
 Baltimore Comic-Con
 Kinetic sculpture race
 Preakness Stakes
 Sowebohemian Arts Festival

June
 HonFest
 BronyCon
 Insubordination Fest

July
 Artscape
 Otakon

August
 Baltimore Pride

September
 Fells Point Fun Festival
 Grand Prix of Baltimore
 Hampdenfest
 Baltimore Museum of Industry

October
 Fells Point Halloween Festival

November
 Greek Festival

December
 Lighting of the Washington Monument
 Old Tyme Christmas Festival in Fells Point
 Hampden Christmas Parade
 Miracle on 34th Street
 Christmas Village in Baltimore

Events
Lists by city in Maryland
Lists of events in the United States
Baltimore-related lists